Markel Lozano Llona (born 3 May 1996) is a Spanish footballer who plays as a midfielder for SD Amorebieta.

Club career
Born in Bilbao, Biscay, Basque Country, Lozano played for Lauro Ikastola CF and Indartsu Club as a youth. On 21 May 2015, he agreed to a contract with Athletic Bilbao, and was assigned to the farm team in Tercera División.

On 31 August 2016, Lozano was loaned to Segunda División B side Zamudio SD for the season. On 28 July of the following year, he moved to fellow league team Arenas Club de Getxo also in a temporary deal.

On 26 June 2018, Loazno signed permanently for Arenas as his contract with Athletic was due to expire. The following 21 January, despite being an undisputed starter, he moved to SD Amorebieta also in the third division.

On 30 January 2020, Lozano joined RC Celta de Vigo and was assigned to the reserves, still in division three. In July 2021, he returned to Amorebieta, with the club now in Segunda División.

Lozano made his professional debut on 23 August 2021, starting in a 0–2 away loss against CD Mirandés.

References

External links

1996 births
Living people
Footballers from Bilbao
Spanish footballers
Association football midfielders
Segunda División players
Segunda División B players
Tercera División players
CD Basconia footballers
Zamudio SD players
Arenas Club de Getxo footballers
SD Amorebieta footballers
Celta de Vigo B players